Tajanjar-e Olya (also Romanized as Tajanjār-e ‘Olyā; also known as Tajanjār-e Bālā) is a village in Pain Khiyaban-e Litkuh Rural District, in the Central District of Amol County, Mazandaran Province, Iran. At the 2006 census, its population was 1,165, in 314 families.

References 

Populated places in Amol County